A total solar eclipse occurred at the Moon's ascending node on 3 November 2013. It was a hybrid eclipse of the Sun with a magnitude of 1.0159, with a small portion over the western Atlantic Ocean at sunrise as an annular eclipse, and the rest of the path as a narrow total solar eclipse. A solar eclipse occurs when the Moon passes between Earth and the Sun, thereby totally or partly obscuring the image of the Sun for a viewer on Earth. A hybrid solar eclipse occurs when the Moon's apparent diameter is smaller than the Sun's in sunrise and sunset, but at Greatest Eclipse the Moon's apparent diameter is larger than the Sun's.

In this particular case the eclipse path starts out as annular and ends as total.

It was the 23rd eclipse of the 143rd Saros cycle, which began with a partial eclipse on March 7, 1617, and will conclude with a partial eclipse on April 23, 2897.

Viewing 
Totality was visible from the northern Atlantic Ocean (east of Florida) to Africa (Gabon (landfall), R. Congo, DR Congo, Uganda, South Sudan, Kenya, Ethiopia, Somalia), with a maximum duration of totality of 1 minute and 39 seconds, visible from the Atlantic Ocean south of Ivory Coast and Ghana.

Places with partial darkening were the Eastern coast of North America, southern Greenland, Bermuda, the Caribbean islands, Costa Rica, Panama, Northern South America, almost all the African continent, the Iberian Peninsula, Italy, Greece, Malta, Southern Russia, the Caucasus, Turkey and the Middle East.

This solar eclipse happened simultaneously with the 2013 Abu Dhabi Grand Prix, and it was possible to observe a partial solar eclipse in Abu Dhabi before the sunset while the F1 race took place, as shown briefly during its broadcast.

From space

Photo gallery

Related eclipses

Eclipses of 2013 
 A partial lunar eclipse on April 25.
 An annular solar eclipse on May 10.
 A penumbral lunar eclipse on May 25.
 A penumbral lunar eclipse on October 18.
 A hybrid solar eclipse on November 3.

Solar eclipses 2011–2014

Saros 143

Inex series

Tritos series

Metonic series

Notes

References

 Eclipse Over New York (partial), APOD 11/4/2013
 Eclipse at 44,000 Feet, APOD 11/7/2013, totality above Atlantic Ocean, 600 miles southeast of Bermuda
 Solar Eclipse from Uganda, APOD 11/8/2013, totality from Pokwero, Nebbi District, Northern Region, Uganda
 An Active Sun During a Total Eclipse, APOD 11/11/2013, combination of Sun in ultraviolet light recorded by the SWAP instrument aboard PROBA2, total eclipse from Gabon, and solar corona taken by LASCO instrument aboard SOHO

External links 
 The annular-total solar eclipse of November 3, 2013
 The story of a most amazing eclipse expedition to this eclipse!

2013 in science
2013 11 03
2013 11 03
November 2013 events
2013 in Gabon
2013 in the Republic of the Congo
2013 in the Democratic Republic of the Congo
2013 in Uganda
2013 in Ethiopia
2013 in South Sudan